St. Petersburg High School, founded in 1898, is a secondary school located in St. Petersburg, Florida. The school's current building, a historic landmark, was built in 1926. It was designed by Missouri architect William B. Ittner. It was listed on the National Register of Historic Places in 1984. The school was billed as the nation's first million dollar high school. The school previously occupied several other historic locations around St. Petersburg, including a location at Mirror Lake (1919–1926).

The International Baccalaureate (IB) Diploma Programme at St. Petersburg High School is the oldest in Florida, IB school number 250 in the world.

Effective July 1, 2017, former assistant principal Darlene Lebo was promoted to principal, succeeding Al Bennett who was promoted to become the Pinellas County School District's Director of Athletics, Pre-K-12 Physical Education, Health Education Programs, and School Wellness.

The school currently has 2,013 students enrolled.

Academics awards

IB diploma graduates automatically qualify for the Florida Bright Futures scholarship.
The class of 2006 had nine National Merit Finalists.
The class of 2010 had ten National Merit Finalists.
The IB graduation class of 2006 had a passing rate of 97%.
The IB graduation class of 2018 had a passing rate of 100%.
A 2003 Newsweek magazine survey of the top 100 high schools in the United States placed St. Pete High as #25. In 2005 (based on 2004 numbers), the survey ranked the school as #35. In 2006 (based on 2005 numbers), the Newsweek survey ranked the school as #63. The ranking is based on the number of IB or Advanced Placement (AP) exams given at a school divided by the number of graduating seniors.
Was ranked as the #2 high school in the Tampa Bay area by the Tampa Bay Times in 2013, behind only Pine View School.

Traditions and spirit

Pride and tradition walk the hallways of St. Petersburg High School. It's considered a faux pas to step on the head of the school's mascot, a green devil, in the front hall of the school. Supposedly, if you step on the head you're supposed to scrub it with a toothbrush. Seniors as well as service clubs take it upon themselves to enforce this rule to a degree. There are also two main courtyards in the school; one courtyard is called the “Junior Courtyard” and is the designated courtyard for freshmen (9th grade) and sophomores (10th grade), though any student may choose to spend time there. The Other courtyard, the "Senior Courtyard", is where juniors (11th grade) and seniors (12th grade) only are allowed to spend time. This unspoken rule where only juniors and seniors may spend time during school hours in the Senior Courtyard is usually regulated simply by way of respecting tradition. Students typically will make and effort to maintain this tradition regardless of grade.

Senior pranks are also a tradition at the school. In 2009, seniors laid sod and soccer goals to make a miniature soccer field in an outdoor passageway. In December 2009, a group of seniors covertly constructed an elaborate holiday-themed decorative spectacle, complete with Christmas lights, a Christmas tree, and inflatable snowmen that covered the stage in the Senior Courtyard and the overlooking rooftop.  Seniors once made the mistake of stopping all of the door locks on the main building with a hardening filling leaving teachers scratching their heads when they came in for work. The students were not aware of the hardening properties of the filler when they performed the prank. In 2010, five seniors performed a less destructive, yet equally disruptive prank by stacking approximately three hundred cinder blocks and balancing a telephone pole on top of it to block the entrance to the parking lot, forcing the faculty and students to park in the surrounding neighborhoods and walk onto campus.

St. Petersburg High School's major longstanding rival is Northeast High School. Pranks are exchanged between the schools during football season such as Northeast painting St. Pete's devil head red and St. Pete painting a shark green and depositing it in Northeast's swimming pool. Sometimes students dye Northeast High School's swimming pool green, as another spirited prank. Varsity football games are large social events at the school and students are encouraged to show school spirit by wearing the school colours (green and white, though black has become an unofficial complement) to school Fridays as well as on football game days as well as cover themselves in paint on game nights.

St. Petersburg High School also has a heavy focus on community service created by students. Students have started Key Club International, Interact, Rojans of Interact and Leo chapters in the school.  Each of these clubs are referred to as "Service Clubs" for their extensive focus on community service. To maintain fairness, each year there is an application period where students are interviewed to join one service club. Clubs compete for members during the weeks close to when the Information Session and the interviews are held through flier advertising, choreographed groups in hallways, and showing club spirit by wearing club shirts. Students may join only one club starting in their sophomore year to give each club an opportunity to make its presence known and attempt to recruit new members by the end of freshman year, though a student may interview during any year after their freshman year.

St. Petersburg High School is the home to Reliance Church, which meets in the school's auditorium.

School Renovations

Fire
On August 31, 2012, around 4:00 AM, a fire started on the roof above the Auditorium (Theatre). The Fire later spread into the Auditorium and then crept into an equipment room. The School incurred over one million dollars worth of smoke and water damage. The school's auditorium was reopened to all students on December 11, 2012, after all damage was either replaced or repaired.

Flooding
Around mid September, St. Petersburg High School's Historic "Bell Building" had a water pipe burst in between the third and second floors. It caused several thousand dollars in damage and rendered most of the class rooms unusable for a few days. The damage was cleared up but some classrooms still showed remnants of the damage; after the renovations made during 2019-2020 school year, the damage done to the building was adequately repaired.

Renovation project
During 2019-2020 school year, the entire campus was upgraded as part of the $32-million project.

Notable alumni

Charlie Crist (1974) – 44th governor of Florida (2007–11), Florida's attorney general from 2003–06, a U.S. Representative from Florida's 13th district from 2017-present.
Eric Lynn – Candidate for Florida's 13th congressional district in 2016, Florida House of Representatives candidate for District 68 in 2016, presumptive Democratic nominee for Florida's 13th congressional district in 2022. 
Jim Haslam (1948) – founder of Pilot Corporation
Charles Horton, football player
Zac MacMath (born 1991), goalkeeper in Major League Soccer
Milt May (1968) Major League baseball player.
David Mendelblatt, yachtsman and ophthalmologist
Mark Mendelblatt, yachtsman, silver medalist at 1999 Pan American Games and 2004 Laser World Championships
Grady Sutton, actor
Shannon O'Donnell, (2002) National Geographic Traveler of the Year
Jacob Barnes, MLB pitcher for the Milwaukee Brewers
Will Packer, American film producer
Bill Young, former American politician who served in the US House of Representatives from 1971 to 2013.

Former principals
 Al Bennett (2006–2017)
Dr. Julie Janssen (2003–2006)
Linda Benware (2000–2003)
Thomas Petit (1995–1999)
Barbara Broughton (1991–1995)
William Grey (1983–1991)
Vyrle Davis Davis (1973–1983) (also first African-American area superintendent in the United States).
Ronald R. Hallam (1969-1973)
Fred "Doc" Geneva (1967-1969)
Douglas McBriarty (1964-1967)
Dr. Albert J. Geiger (1934-1947)

References

External links

School homepage
Satellite Photo 2004
St. Pete High history

Educational institutions established in 1898
National Register of Historic Places in Pinellas County, Florida
High schools in Pinellas County, Florida
1898 establishments in Florida
William B. Ittner buildings
Public high schools in Florida